Charles Cameron (1766–1828) was Civil Commissioner of Malta and then Governor of the Bahamas.

Career
Born the son of Donald Cameron and Mary Guy, Cameron became Civil Commissioner of Malta in 1801. He issued a proclamation to the Maltese people in July 1801 making it clear that he would uphold their laws and rights. He went on to be Governor of Bahamas in 1804 until his resignation in 1820. He was also a partner of Harley, Cameron & Company, a firm with shipping ventures in the East Indies.

Personal Life
In 1789 he married Lady Margaret Hay, daughter of James Hay, 15th Earl of Erroll; they had one son, Charles Hay Cameron, and two daughters. He died in Roydon, Norfolk on 26 June 1828.

References

|-

1766 births
1828 deaths
Governors and Governors-General of Malta
British governors of the Bahamas